Robert Budde (born September 6, 1966) is a Canadian poet and novelist.

Born in Minneapolis, Minnesota, he immigrated to Canada in 1970.
MA from University of Manitoba, PhD from University of Calgary.
Budde lives in Prince George, British Columbia and is currently a professor at the University of Northern British Columbia.

Bibliography

Poetry
Catch as Catch - 1994
traffick - 1997
Finding Fort George - 2007
Declining America - 2010
Dreamland Theatre - 2014

Novels
Misshapen - 1997
The Dying Poem - 2002

Short fiction
flicker - 2004

Non-fiction
Muddy Water: Conversations with 11 Poets - 2003

Anthologies
The More Easily Kept Illusions: The Poetry of Al Purdy - 2006
The Forestry Diversification Project - 2006

1966 births
Academics in British Columbia
20th-century Canadian poets
20th-century Canadian male writers
Canadian male poets
21st-century Canadian poets
20th-century Canadian novelists
21st-century Canadian novelists
Canadian male novelists
Canadian male short story writers
Canadian non-fiction writers
Writers from British Columbia
Living people
Academic staff of the University of Northern British Columbia
21st-century Canadian short story writers
20th-century Canadian short story writers
21st-century Canadian male writers
Canadian male non-fiction writers